Didia striatella is a species of snout moth in the genus Didia. It was described by Inoue in 1959. It is found in Japan.

References

Moths described in 1959
Phycitini
Moths of Japan